Elections were held on November 2, 2010, to determine Michigan's 15 members of the United States House of Representatives. Representatives were elected for two-year terms to serve in the 112th United States Congress from January 3, 2011, until January 3, 2013. Primary elections were held on August 3, 2010.

Of the 15 elections, the 1st, 7th and 9th districts were rated as competitive by Sabato's Crystal Ball, CQ Politics and The Rothenberg Political Report, while The Cook Political Report rated the 1st, 3rd, 7th and 9th districts as competitive. Three of Michigan's fifteen incumbents (Bart Stupak of the 1st district, Pete Hoekstra of the 2nd district and Vern Ehlers of the 3rd district) did not seek re-election. Of the twelve who did, one (Carolyn Cheeks Kilpatrick of the 13th district) was not renominated by her party, and one (Mark Schauer of the 7th district) was unsuccessful in the general election.

In total, nine Republicans and six Democrats were elected. A total of 3,194,901 votes were cast, of which 1,671,707 (52 percent) were for Republicans, 1,415,212 (44 percent) were for Democrats, 43,279 (1 percent) were for Libertarian Party candidates, 27,273 (1 percent) were for U.S. Taxpayers Party candidates, 25,739 (1 percent) were for Green Party candidates, 11,238 (0.4 percent) were for independent candidates, 409 (0.01 percent) were for a Natural Law Party candidate and 44 (0.001 percent) were for write-in candidates.

Overview
Results of the 2010 United States House of Representatives elections in Michigan by district:

District 1

In 2010 the 1st district included Marquette and Sault Ste. Marie. The district's population was 93 percent white (see Race and ethnicity in the United States Census); 88 percent were high school graduates and 18 percent had received a bachelor's degree or higher. Its median income was $40,243. In the 2008 presidential election the district gave 50 percent of its vote to Democratic nominee Barack Obama and 48 percent to Republican nominee John McCain. In 2010 the district had a Cook Partisan Voting Index of R+3.

Democrat Bart Stupak, who took office in 1993, was the incumbent. Stupak was re-elected in 2008 with 65 percent of the vote. In 2010 Stupak retired rather than seeking re-election. The candidates in the general election were Democratic nominee Gary McDowell, a member of the Michigan House of Representatives; Republican nominee Dan Benishek, a physician; Green Party nominee Ellis Boal, a former Charlevoix County commissioner and prosecutor; U.S. Taxpayers Party nominee Patrick Lambert, a shift supervisor at Kalitta Air; Libertarian Party nominee Keith Shelton, a sports reporter; and independent candidate Glenn Wilson, the owner of an Internet service provider. Lonnie Lee Snyder had intended to run as a Tea Party candidate, but was found ineligible to do so in August 2010.

McDowell ran unopposed in the Democratic primary, as Mike Prusi, a member of the Michigan Senate, announced in April 2010 that he would not run; and Matt Gillard, a former member of the state House of Representatives; Connie Saltonstall, a former county official; and Joel Sheltrown, a member of the state House of Representatives, ended their campaigns in May 2010. Jason Allen, a member of the state Senate; Patrick Donlon, a businessman; Don Hooper, the owner of a trucking business; and Tom Stillings, a steel industry sales representative, also sought the Republican nomination. Linda Goldthorpe, a lawyer, suspended her campaign in July 2010; however her name remained on the Republican primary ballot. Dennis Lennox, the Cheboygan County drain commissioner, ended his campaign for the Republican nomination in March 2010. Jim Barcia, a former U.S. Representative; and Kevin Elsenheimer, the leader of the Republican Party in the state House of Representatives, both said in April 2010 they would not run. A poll conducted by Practical Political Consulting and released in July 2010, with a sample size of 140, found Benishek leading with 21 percent followed by Allen with 19 percent; Donlon, Goldthorpe, Hooper and Stillings each had the support of less than 2 percent of respondents, while around 55 percent were undecided.

McDowell raised $838,208 and spent $838,160. Benishek raised $1,379,311 and spent $1,343,624. Wilson raised $127,237 and spent $118,276. Allen raised $379,899 and spent $379,979. Goldthorpe raised $9,244 and spent $5,410.

A poll of 1,016 registered voters, conducted in August 2010 by We Ask America, found Benishek leading with 45 percent to McDowell's 29 percent, while 27 percent chose "Other/Unsure". In a poll of 406 likely voters by TargetPoint Consulting, conducted for Benishek's campaign between August 31 and September 1, 2010, Benishek led McDowell by 39 percent to 25 percent when the names of Wilson and Snyder were also given, and by 54 percent to 31 percent when Benishek and McDowell were the only names offered. A poll of 400 likely voters conducted by Hill Research Associates for the National Republican Congressional Committee between September 19 and September 21, 2010, found Benishek leading with 40 percent to McDowell's 24 percent. In a poll by Greenberg Quinlan Rosner for McDowell's campaign, conducted on September 21 and 22, 2010, with a sample size of 505 likely voters, Benishek led with 41 percent while McDowell received 38 percent, Wilson received 12 percent and 9 percent were undecided. A poll of 401 likely voters published by The Hill, conducted between October 2 and 7, 2010, 42 percent of respondents supported Benishek while 39 percent favored McDowell and 18 percent were undecided. In a poll of 400 likely voters by EPIC/MRA, conducted on October 17 and 18, 2010, Benishek led with 42 percent to McDowell's 40 percent. Though Benishek won the Republican primary by a margin of only 15 votes, Allen, who placed second, chose not to seek a recount.

Sabato's Crystal Ball rated the race as "Leans Republican". In October 2010 The Cook Political Report and CQ Politics rated the race as "Leans Republican". In November 2010 The Rothenberg Political Report rated the race as "Toss-up/Tilt Republican". Prior to the election FiveThirtyEights forecast gave Benishek an 88 percent chance of winning, and projected that he would receive 52 percent of the vote to McDowell's 45 percent. On election day Benishek was elected with 52 percent of the vote to McDowell's 41 percent. Benishek was re-elected in 2012, again against McDowell, and in 2014.

Republican primary results

 
 
 
 
 
 
 
 

General election results

 
 
 
 
 
 
 
 

External links

 
 
 
 
 
 
 
 
 
 
 

District 2

The 2nd district included Holland, Muskegon and Norton Shores. The district's population was 86 percent white and 6 percent Hispanic (see Race and ethnicity in the United States Census); 88 percent were high school graduates and 21 percent had received a bachelor's degree or higher. Its median income was $47,736. In the 2008 presidential election the district gave 51 percent of its vote to Republican nominee John McCain and 47 percent to Democratic nominee Barack Obama.

Republican Pete Hoekstra, who took office in 1993, was the incumbent. Hoekstra was re-elected in 2008 with 62 percent of the vote. In 2010 Hoekstra ran for Governor of Michigan rather than seeking re-election. The candidates in the general election were Republican nominee Bill Huizenga, a member of the Michigan House of Representatives; Democratic nominee Fred Johnson, an associate professor of history at Hope College; Green Party nominee Lloyd Clarke, a former United Auto Workers representative; Libertarian Party nominee Joseph Gillotte, the founder and owner of Presort Services Inc.; and U.S. Taxpayers Party nominee Ronald Graeser, a Doctor of Osteopathic Medicine.

Bill Cooper, a small business owner; Wayne Kuipers, a member of the Michigan Senate; Chris Larson, a member of the Ferrysburg city council; Field Reichardt, the president of the Organic Olive Oil Co., Jay Riemersma, a former American football player; and Ted Schendel, a retired police officer, also sought the Republican nomination. Jeff Wincel, the owner of a consulting firm, sought the Republican nomination but ended his campaign in April 2010. In a poll of 335 likely Republican voters, conducted between July 26 and 28, 2010, by The Grand Rapids Press, 25 percent of respondents favored Riemersma, while 15 percent favored Cooper, the same percentage favored Huizenga, 13 percent favored Kuipers, and 30 percent were undecided. After the primary Huizenga led Riemersma by less than 700 votes; however Riemersma released a statement saying he would not seek a recount. Nicolette McClure, a Lake County commissioner, also sought the Democratic nomination.

Huizenga raised $684,347 and spent $634,952. Johnson raised $125,474 and spent $119,305. Cooper raised $310,497 and spent the same amount. Kuipers raised $232,223 and spent the same amount. Reichardt raised $151,160 and spent $151,064. Riemersma raised $917,362 and spent $915,037. Schendel raised $6,451 and spent $6,651. Wincel raised $14,185 and spent $14,044. McClure raised $20,856 and spent $19,429.

Prior to the election FiveThirtyEights forecast gave Huizenga a 100 percent chance of winning, and projected that he would receive 63 percent of the vote to Johnson's 34 percent. On election day Huizenga was elected with 65 percent of the vote to Johnson's 32 percent. Huizenga was re-elected in 2012 and 2014.

Republican primary results

 
 
 
 
 
 
 
 
 

Democratic primary results

 
 
 
 

General election results

 
 
 
 
 
 
 

External links
 
 
 
 
 
 
 
 
 

District 3

The 3rd district included Grand Rapids and Wyoming. The district's population was 80 percent white, 8 percent Hispanic and 8 percent black (see Race and ethnicity in the United States Census); 88 percent were high school graduates and 28 percent had received a bachelor's degree or higher. Its median income was $51,386. In the 2008 presidential election, Republican nominee John McCain and Democratic nominee Barack Obama each received 49 percent of the vote in the district. In 2010 the district had a Cook Partisan Voting Index of R+6.

Republican Vern Ehlers, who took office in 1993, was the incumbent. Ehlers was re-elected in 2008 with 61 percent of the vote. In 2010 Ehlers retired rather than seeking re-election. The candidates in the general election were Republican nominee Justin Amash, a member of the Michigan House of Representatives; Democratic nominee Patrick Miles Jr., a lawyer; U.S. Taxpayers Party nominee Ted Gerrard, an electrician; Libertarian Party nominee James Rogers, a technical consultant in the fields of renewable energy and HVAC; and Green Party nominee Charlie Shick, an employee in the field of warehouse inventory control.

Bill Hardiman, a member of the Michigan Senate; Steve Heacock, a former Kent County commissioner; Louise "Ellie" Johnson, an attorney; and Bob Overbeek, a United States Air Force veteran, also sought the Republican nomination. Terri Lynn Land, the Secretary of State of Michigan; and Dick Posthumus, a former Lieutenant Governor of Michigan; both said in February 2010 that they would not seek the Republican nomination. In a poll of 485 likely voters, conducted by The Grand Rapids Press between July 26 and 30, 2010, 28 percent of respondents favored Amash, while 23 percent supported Hardiman, 17 percent backed Heacock, and 26 percent were undecided. Paul Mayhue, a former Kent County commissioner, also sought the Democratic nomination.

Amash raised $1,103,513 and spent $1,093,007. Miles raised $990,599 and spent $988,091. Gerrard raised $1,405 and spent $2,082. Rogers raised $7,920 and spent $8,611. Hardiman raised $209,236 and spent $202,459. Heacock raised $393,212 and spent the same amount. Overbeek raised $9,213 and spent $6,789. Mayhue raised $11,636 and spent $9,773.

In a poll of 1,006 registered voters, conducted by We Ask America in August 2010, 51 percent of respondents supported Amash while 30 percent favored Miles and 19 percent chose "Other/Unsure". A poll of 400 likely voters, conducted by EPIC/MRA between October 16 and 19, 2010, found Amash leading with 46 percent to Miles's 37 percent, while 8 percent supported other candidates and 9 percent were undecided. A poll of 400 likely voters, conducted by Public Opinion Strategies on October 19 and 20, 2010, found Amash leading with 49 percent to Miles's 30 percent.

In October 2010 The Cook Political Report rated the race as "Likely Republican". Prior to the election FiveThirtyEights forecast gave Amash a 99 percent chance of winning, and projected that he would receive 59 percent of the vote to Miles's 38 percent. On election day Amash was elected with 60 percent of the vote to Miles's 37 percent. In July 2012 Miles was confirmed as the United States Attorney for the Western District of Michigan. Amash was re-elected in November of that year and in 2014.

Republican primary results

 
 
 
 
 
 
 

Democratic primary results

 
 
 
 

General election results

 
 
 
 
 
 
 

External links
 
 
 
 
 
 
 
 
 

District 4

The 4th district included Mount Pleasant and part of Midland. The district's population was 91 percent white (see Race and ethnicity in the United States Census); 88 percent were high school graduates and 21 percent had received a bachelor's degree or higher. Its median income was $43,605. In the 2008 presidential election the district gave 50 percent of its vote to Democratic nominee Barack Obama and 48 percent to Republican nominee John McCain.

Republican Dave Camp, who took office in 1991, was the incumbent. Camp was re-elected in 2008 with 62 percent of the vote. In 2010, Camp's opponent in the general election was Democratic nominee Jerry M. Campbell, a former supervisor of Richfield Township, Roscommon County. Libertarian Party nominee John Emerick and U.S. Taxpayers Party nominee Clint Foster, a home remodeling sales representative, also ran. Both Camp and Campbell were unopposed in their party primaries.

Camp raised $3,051,808 and spent $2,148,515. Campbell raised $15,881 and spent $15,880. Prior to the election ''FiveThirtyEights forecast gave Camp a 100 percent chance of winning, and projected that he would receive 66 percent of the vote to Campbell's 31 percent. On election day Camp was re-elected with 66 percent of the vote to Campbell's 31 percent. Camp was again re-elected in 2012 and retired rather than seeking re-election in 2014. He was succeeded by Republican John Moolenaar.

General election results

 
 
 
 
 
 

External links
 

District 5

The 5th district included Bay City, Burton, Flint and Saginaw. The district's population was 76 percent white and 18 percent black (see Race and ethnicity in the United States Census); 87 percent were high school graduates and 18 percent had received a bachelor's degree or higher. Its median income was $42,578. In the 2008 presidential election the district gave 64 percent of its vote to Democratic nominee Barack Obama and 35 percent to Republican nominee John McCain.

Democrat Dale Kildee, who took office in 1977, was the incumbent. Kildee was re-elected with 70 percent of the vote in 2008. In 2010, Kildee's opponent in the general election was Republican nominee John Kupiec, a businessman. Green Party nominee J. Matthew de Heus, an instructor at Delta College, also ran. Libertarian Party nominee Michael J. Moon, a technician at XO Communications, withdrew from the race in October 2010. Rick Wilson, a former supervisor for General Motors, also sought the Republican nomination. Scott Withers, the owner of Withers Media and a former vice president of the Auction Network, also sought the Democratic nomination.

Kildee raised $622,561 and spent $1,207,958. Kupiec raised $356,589 and spent $356,390. Wilson raised $71,073 and spent $70,114. Withers raised $14,628 and spent $13,660.

Prior to the election FiveThirtyEights forecast gave Kildee a 100 percent chance of winning, and projected that he would receive 63 percent of the vote to Kupiec's 34 percent. In October 2010 John Fund of The Wall Street Journal named the race as one of "five districts that could deliver upset victories", citing the possibility that Michigan's straight-ticket voting system would result in Rick Snyder's successful gubernatorial campaign affecting the results of congressional races. On election day Kildee was re-elected with 53 percent of the vote to Kupiec's 44 percent. Kildee retired rather than seeking re-election in 2012 and was succeeded by his nephew Dan Kildee.

Democratic primary results

 
 
 
 

Republican primary results

 
 
 
 

General election results

 
 
 
 
 
 

External links
 
 
 

District 6

The 6th district included Kalamazoo, Niles, Portage and Sturgis. The district's population was 83 percent white, 8 percent black and 5 percent Hispanic (see Race and ethnicity in the United States Census); 88 percent were high school graduates and 24 percent had received a bachelor's degree or higher. Its median income was $45,661. In the 2008 presidential election the district gave 54 percent of its vote to Democratic nominee Barack Obama and 44 percent to Republican nominee John McCain.

Republican Fred Upton, who took office in 1987, was the incumbent. In 2008 Upton was re-elected with 59 percent of the vote. In 2010, Upton's opponent in the general election was Democratic nominee Don Cooney, a Kalamazoo city commissioner and professor of social work. Green Party nominee Pat Foster, an accountant; Libertarian Party nominee Fred Strand, a restaurant owner and retired airline pilot; and U.S. Taxpayers Party nominee Mel Valkner, a business owner and accountant, also ran. Jack Hoogendyk, a former member of the Michigan House of Representatives, also sought the Republican nomination. Cooney was unopposed in the Democratic primary.

Upton raised $2,014,321 and spent $2,083,790. Cooney raised $62,447 and spent $61,614. Hoogendyk raised $67,817 and spent $66,644.

Prior to the election FiveThirtyEights forecast gave Upton a 100 percent chance of winning, and projected that he would receive 63 percent of the vote to Cooney's 34 percent. On election day Upton was re-elected with 62 percent of the vote to Cooney's 34 percent. Upton was again re-elected in 2012 and 2014, while in 2013 Cooney ran for re-election as city commissioner.

Republican primary results

 
 
 
 

General election results

 
 
 
 
 
 
 

External links
 
 
 
 

District 7

The 7th district included Battle Creek and Jackson. The district's population was 88 percent white and 6 percent black (see Race and ethnicity in the United States Census); 89 percent were high school graduates and 22 percent had received a bachelor's degree or higher. Its median income was $50,824. In the 2008 presidential election the district gave 52 percent of its vote to Democratic nominee Barack Obama and 46 percent to Republican Party nominee John McCain. In 2010 the district had a Cook Partisan Voting Index of R+2.

Democrat Mark Schauer, who took office in 2009, was the incumbent. Schauer was elected in 2008 with 49 percent of the vote. In 2010, Schauer's opponent in the general election was Republican nominee Tim Walberg, a former U.S. Representative. U.S. Taxpayers Party nominee Scott Eugene Aughney, a sales and marketing agent in the food industry; write-in candidate Dan Davis; Libertarian Party nominee Greg Merle, an insurance salesman; and Green Party nominee Richard E. Wunsch, a taxi driver and bookstore owner, also ran. Davis, a former police officer, had intended to run as a Tea Party candidate in the general election but was removed from the ballot in August 2010.

Schauer ran unopposed in the Democratic primary. Marvin Carlson, a businessman; and Iraq War veteran Brian Rooney also sought the Republican nomination. Mike Stahly also briefly ran in the Republican primary, but ended his campaign due to fundraising difficulties. Former U.S. Representative Joe Schwarz, a Republican, said in April 2009 that he would not run again. In a poll of the Republican primary, released by Inside Michigan Politics in July 2010, 48 percent of respondents supported Walberg while 16 percent favored Rooney and 30 percent were undecided.

Schauer raised $3,255,382 and spent $3,261,651. Walberg raised $1,678,049 and spent $1,647,379. Aughney raised $723 and spent $715. Carlson raised $42,180 and spent $42,798. Rooney raised $777,205 and spent $767,104.

In a poll of 300 likely voters conducted by National Research Inc. for Walberg's campaign, the results of which were published in January 2010, 46 percent of respondents supported Walberg while 37 percent favored Schauer. Among the same sample Schauer led Rooney by 39 percent to 31 percent. A poll of 1,008 likely voters conducted by We Ask America on August 4, 2010 found Walberg leading with 45 percent to Schauer's 37 percent while 18 percent were undecided. In a poll of 400 likely voters, conducted by Republican pollster Whit Ayres between August 16 and 18, 2010, that informed respondents of Schauer's support for the Patient Protection and Affordable Care Act, Walberg led with 50 percent to Schauer's 40 percent. A poll by Rossman Group and Team TelCom, conducted on September 20, 2010, with a sample size of 300 likely voters, found Walberg leading with 42 percent to Schauer's 38 percent. An internal poll for Schauer's campaign by Myers Research & Strategic Services, published on September 23, 2010, found Schauer leading in a two-candidate race with 49 percent to Walberg's 45 percent, and in a multi-candidate race with 45 percent to Walberg's 43 percent while third party candidates collectively received 5 percent. In a poll of 404 likely voters conducted between September 25 and 27, 2010, and published by The Hill Schauer and Walberg received the support of 41 percent of respondents each, while 13 percent remained undecided. In a poll of 500 likely voters, conducted by Myers Research & Strategic Services on October 3 and 4, 2010, Schauer led with 44 percent to Walberg's 40 percent, while 7 percent supported third party candidates. An EPIC/MRA poll of 400 people, conducted on October 16 and 17, found Schauer leading with 45 percent to Walberg's 39 percent. In a poll conducted for 6 News with a margin of error of plus or minus 5 percent, the results of which were published on October 27, 2010, 50 percent of respondents supported Schauer, while 43 percent favored Walberg, 3 percent chose Wunsch, Aughney and Merle received the support of 1 percent apiece, and 2 percent were undecided. An internal poll with a margin of error of 5.6 percent, conducted by National Research Inc. for Walberg's campaign and published on October 28, 2010, found Walberg leading Schauer by 13 percentage points.Sabato's Crystal Ball rated the race as "Leans Republican". In October 2010 The Cook Political Report rated the race as a "toss up" and CQ Politics rated the race as a "tossup". In November 2010 The Rothenberg Political Report rated the race as a "Pure Toss-up". Prior to the election FiveThirtyEights forecast gave Walberg a 59 percent chance of winning and projected that he would receive 49 percent of the vote to Schauer's 48 percent.

On election day Walberg was elected with 50 percent of the vote to Schauer's 45 percent. Walberg was again re-elected in 2012 and 2014. Schauer unsuccessfully ran for Governor of Michigan in 2014.

 Republican primary results 

 
 
 
 
 

 General election results 

 
 
 
 
 
 
 
 

 External links 

District 8

The 8th district included East Lansing, Holt and part of Lansing. The district's population was 87 percent white and 5 percent black (see Race and ethnicity in the United States Census); 92 percent were high school graduates and 32 percent had received a bachelor's degree or higher. Its median income was $59,508. In the 2008 presidential election the district gave 53 percent of its vote to Democratic nominee Barack Obama and 46 percent to Republican nominee John McCain.

Republican Mike Rogers, who took office in 2001, was the incumbent. Rogers was re-elected in 2008 with 57 percent of the vote. Rogers announced in February 2009 that he would not run for Governor of Michigan in 2010. Rogers's opponent in 2010 was Democratic nominee Lance Enderle, who ran Leslie's alternative education program. Libertarian Party nominee Bhagwan Dashairya, the president and chief executive officer of Dashairya & Associates, also ran. Rogers ran unopposed in the Republican primary. Enderle ran unopposed as a write-in candidate in the Democratic primary after health care analyst Kande Ngalamulume suspended his campaign after the withdrawal deadline.

Rogers raised $1,778,687 and spent $861,244. Enderle raised $12,339 and spent $12,169. Ngalamulume raised $27,036 and spent the same amount.

Prior to the election FiveThirtyEights forecast gave Rogers a 100 percent chance of winning and projected that he would receive 63 percent of the vote to Enderle's 34 percent. On election day Rogers was re-elected with 64 percent of the vote to Enderle's 34 percent. Rogers and Enderle both ran again in 2012, when Rogers was again re-elected; Rogers retired rather than seeking re-election in 2014 and was succeeded by Republican Mike Bishop.

General election results

 
 
 
 
 
 
 

External links
 
 
 

District 9

The 9th district included Auburn Hills, Farmington Hills, Pontiac, Rochester Hills, Troy and parts of Royal Oak and Waterford. The district's population was 77 percent white, 10 percent black and 7 percent Asian (see Race and ethnicity in the United States Census); 93 percent were high school graduates and 48 percent had received a bachelor's degree or higher. Its median income was $72,774. In the 2008 presidential election the district gave 56 percent of its vote to Democratic nominee Barack Obama and 43 percent to Republican nominee John McCain. In 2010 the district had a Cook Partisan Voter Index of D+2.

Democrat Gary Peters, who took office in 2009, was the incumbent. Peters was elected in 2008 with 52 percent of the vote. In January 2010 Peters said he would not run for Governor of Michigan that year. Peters's opponent in 2010 was Republican nominee Rocky Raczkowski, a former member of the Michigan Legislature. Green Party nominee Douglas Campbell, an engineer; and independent candidate Matthew Kuofie, a professor at institutions including the University of Michigan, also ran. Libertarian Party nominee Adam Goodman, a district manager for Ovations Dining; and independent candidate Bob Gray, an educator and former member of the executive board of the Michigan Republican Party, both of whose names appeared on the ballot, ended their campaigns prior to the election.

Peters ran unopposed in the Democratic primary. Anna Janek, a beauty consultant; Richard Kuhn, a former circuit court judge; and Paul Welday, a businessman, also sought the Republican nomination. Gene Goodman, a manufacturer, ran as a Republican but ended his campaign in May 2010. A poll of 120 likely Republican voters, conducted by Mitchell Research & Communication for Welday's campaign on March 31 and April 1, 2010 and on April 4 and 5, 2010, found Welday leading with 25 percent to Raczkowski's 17 percent, while Goodman received 2 percent. In a poll of 900 likely Republican voters, conducted by Strategic National for Raczkowski's campaign on April 29, 2010, 26 percent of respondents favored Raczkowski while 15 percent supported Welday and 59 percent were undecided.

Peters raised $3,284,646 and spent $3,236,452. Raczkowski raised $2,038,244 and spent $1,995,898. Kuhn raised $51,378 and spent the same amount. Welday raised $561,897 and spent $560,794. Goodman raised $16,118 and spent the same amount.

In a poll conducted by The Rossman Group and Team TelCom, the results of which were published in September 2010, 45 percent of the 300 respondents intended to vote for Raczkowski while 41 percent supported Peters and 10 percent were undecided. A poll of 400 people, conducted by EPIC/MRA on October 16 and 17, 2010, found Peters leading with 48 percent to Raczkowski's 43 percent. In a poll by Great Lakes Strategies, published later in October 2010 and with a sample size of 700, Raczkowski led with 48 percent to Peters's 43 percent.

Sabato's Crystal Ball rated the race as "Leans Democratic". In October 2010, The Cook Political Report rated the race as "Lean Democratic" and CQ Politics rated the race as "Likely Democratic". In November 2010 The Rothenberg Political Report rated the race as "Lean Democrat". Prior to the election FiveThirtyEights forecast gave Peters a 76 percent chance of winning and projected that he would receive 51 percent of the vote to Raczkowski's 47 percent. On election day Peters was re-elected with 50 percent of the vote to Raczkowski's 47 percent. Peters was re-elected in the new 14th district in 2012; and elected to the U.S. Senate in 2014.

Republican primary results

 
 
 
 
 
 

General election results

 
 
 
 
 
 
 
 

See also
 Electoral history of Gary Peters

External links

 
 
 
 
 
 

District 10

The 10th district included Port Huron, Shelby and part of Sterling Heights. The district's population was 92 percent white (see Race and ethnicity in the United States Census); 88 percent were high school graduates and 21 percent had received a bachelor's degree or higher. Its median income was $58,791. In the 2008 presidential election the district gave 50 percent of its vote to Republican nominee John McCain and 48 percent to Democratic nominee Barack Obama.

Republican Candice Miller, who took office in 2003, was the incumbent. Miller was re-elected in 2008 with 66 percent of the vote. In 2010 her opponent in the general election was Democratic nominee Henry Yanez, a firefighter and paramedic. Libertarian Party nominee Claude Beavers, a private practice attorney; and Green Party nominee Candace R. Caveny, a retired Doctor of Osteopathic Medicine, also ran. Both Miller and Yanez ran unopposed in their respective party primaries.

Miller raised $761,649 and spent $846,119. Prior to the election ''FiveThirtyEights forecast gave Miller a 100 percent chance of winning and projected that she would receive 69 percent of the vote to Yanez's 29 percent. On election day Miller was re-elected with 72 percent of the vote to Yanez's 25 percent. Miller was again re-elected in 2012 and 2014.

General election results

 
 
 
 
 
 

External links
 
 
 

District 11

The 11th district included Canton, Garden City, Livonia, Novi, Redford and Westland. The district's population was 83 percent white, 7 percent black and 5 percent Asian (see Race and ethnicity in the United States Census); 91 percent were high school graduates and 33 percent had received a bachelor's degree or higher. Its median income was $66,868. In the 2008 presidential election the district gave 54 percent of its vote to Democratic nominee Barack Obama and 45 percent to Republican nominee John McCain.

Republican Thaddeus McCotter, who took office in 2003, was the incumbent. McCotter was re-elected in 2008 with 51 percent of the vote. In 2010 McCotter's opponent in the general election was Democratic nominee Natalie Mosher, a nonprofit consultant. Libertarian Party nominee John J. Tatar, the owner of a construction company, also ran. McCotter and Mosher were unopposed in their respective party primaries. Andy Dillon, the speaker of the Michigan House of Representatives, said in March 2009 that he would not seek the Democratic nomination.

McCotter raised $1,195,301 and spent $870,514. Mosher raised $307,081 and spent the same amount. Prior to the election FiveThirtyEights forecast gave McCotter a 99 percent chance of winning and projected that he would receive 58 percent of the vote to Mosher's 39 percent. On election day McCotter was re-elected with 59 percent of the vote to Mosher's 38 percent.

In July 2011, McCotter announced he would run for president in 2012. McCotter ended his campaign in September 2011 and resigned as a U.S. Representative in June 2012 after failing to qualify for the primary ballot. He was succeeded by Democrat David Curson. In 2014 Mosher unsuccessfully sought the Democratic nomination in the Michigan House of Representatives's 21st district.

General election results

 
 
 
 
 

External links
 
 

District 12

The 12th district included Clinton, Roseville, Southfield, St. Clair Shores, Warren and part of Sterling Heights. The district's population was 75 percent white and 18 percent black (see Race and ethnicity in the United States Census); 86 percent were high school graduates and 21 percent had received a bachelor's degree or higher. Its median income was $49,559. In the 2008 presidential election the district gave 65 percent of its vote to Democratic nominee Barack Obama and 33 percent to Republican nominee John McCain.

Democrat Sander Levin, who took office in 1983, was the incumbent. He was re-elected in 2008 with 72 percent of the vote. In 2010 his opponent in the general election was Republican nominee Don Volaric, the owner of a health insurance agency. Natural Law Party nominee Alan Jacquemotte; Libertarian Party nominee Leonard Schwartz, a lawyer and former professor of business law; U.S. Taxpayers Party nominee Les Townsend, a former officer of the Internal Revenue Service; and Green Party nominee Julia Williams, a critical care and emergency room nurse, also ran.

Michael Switalski, a member of the Michigan Senate, also sought the Democratic nomination. In a poll of 400 likely Democratic primary voters, taken on March 17 and 18, 2010 by the Mellmann Group for Levin's campaign, 62 percent of respondents favored Levin while 14 percent supported Switalski and 24 percent were undecided. Volaric was unopposed in the Republican primary.

Levin raised $2,345,155 and spent $2,392,309. Volaric raised $62,174 and spent $57,383. Switalski raised $51,553 and spent $46,450.

Prior to the election FiveThirtyEights forecast gave Levin a 100 percent chance of winning and projected that he would receive 67 percent of the vote to Volaric's 30 percent. On election day Levin was re-elected with 61 percent of the vote to Volaric's 35 percent. Levin was re-elected in 2012, again against Volaric, and in 2014.

Democratic primary results

General election results

External links

District 13

The 13th district included parts of Detroit and Lincoln Park. The district's population was 59 percent black, 28 percent white and 10 percent Hispanic (see Race and ethnicity in the United States Census); 76 percent were high school graduates and 15 percent had received a bachelor's degree or higher. Its median income was $32,212. In the 2008 presidential election the district gave 85 percent of its vote to Democratic nominee Barack Obama and 14 percent to Republican nominee John McCain.

Democrat Carolyn Cheeks Kilpatrick, who took office in 1997, was the incumbent. Kilpatrick was re-elected in 2008 with 74 percent of the vote. In 2010 Hansen Clarke, a member of the Michigan Senate, successfully challenged Kilpatrick in the Democratic primary. In the general election Clarke faced Republican nominee John Hauler, a military contractor and the founder of the Metro Detroit Freedom Coalition; Green Party nominee George Corsetti, a criminal defense attorney; independent candidate Duane Montgomery, an information system consultant; and Libertarian Party nominee Heidi Peterson, an actress and model. John W. Broad, the president of Crime Stoppers of Michigan; Vincent T. Brown, a community organizer with Clean Water Action; Stephen Hume, a boat yard operator; and Glenn Plummer, the founder and chair of the Christian Television Network, also sought the Democratic nomination. Hauler ran unopposed in the Republican primary.

In a poll with a sample size of 137, conducted by Practical Political Consulting and Inside Michigan Politics and released in June 2010, Clarke led with 27 percent to Kilpatrick's 19 percent. A poll of 400 likely voters conducted by EPIC/MRA on July 6 and 7, 2010, found Clarke leading with 44 percent to Kilpatrick's 31 percent, while Broad, Brown, Hume and Plummer collectively received 9 percent. In a poll conducted by The Detroit News and WDIV, released on July 16, 2010, 38 percent of respondents supported Clarke while 30 percent favored Kilpatrick.

Kilpatrick raised $640,991 and spent $784,219. Clarke raised $578,399 and spent $346,510. Hauler raised $33,160 and spent $16,855. Broad raised $228,690 and spent $133,148. Plummer raised $55,113 and spent $53,401.

Prior to the election ''FiveThirtyEights forecast gave Clarke a 100 percent chance of winning and projected that he would receive 68 percent of the vote to Hauler's 29 percent. On election day Clarke was re-elected with 79 percent of the vote to Hauler's 18 percent. Clarke ran unsuccessfully in the Democratic primary in the redrawn 14th district in 2012, when Hauler was again unsuccessful as the Republican nominee; and in 2014.

Democratic primary results

 
 
 
 
 
 
 
 

General election results

 
 
 
 
 
 
 
 

See also
 Electoral history of Hansen Clarke

External links
 
 
 
 
 

District 14

The 14th district included Allen Park, Hamtramck, Southgate and parts of Dearborn and Detroit. The district's population was 60 percent black and 34 percent white (see Race and ethnicity in the United States Census); 81 percent were high school graduates and 16 percent had received a bachelor's degree or higher. Its median income was $37,323. In the 2008 presidential election the district gave 86 percent of its vote to Democratic nominee Barack Obama and 13 percent to Republican nominee John McCain.

Democrat John Conyers, who took office in 1965, was the incumbent. Conyers was re-elected in 2008 with 92 percent of the vote. In 2010 his opponent in the general election was Republican nominee Don Ukrainec, an instructor in the Riverview Community School District. Libertarian Party nominee Richard J. Secula, a former skilled tradesman; and U.S. Taxpayers Party nominee Marc J. Sosnowski, a property manager, also ran. Conyers was unopposed in the Democratic primary. Pauline Montie, the owner of Montie's Shell, Montie's Service and Al's Garage, also sought the Republican nomination.

Conyers raised $1,137,010 and spent $1,127,587. Ukrainec raised $16,506 and raised the same amount. Prior to the election FiveThirtyEight'''s forecast gave Conyers a 100 percent chance of winning and projected that he would receive 77 percent of the vote to Ukrainec's 21 percent. On election day Conyers was re-elected with 77 percent of the vote to Ukrainec's 20 percent. Conyers was again re-elected in 2012 and 2014.

Republican primary results

 
 
 
 

General election results

 
 
 
 
 
 

See also
 Electoral history of John Conyers

External links
 
 
 
 

District 15

The 15th district included Inkster, Monroe, Romulus, Taylor and parts of Ann Arbor, Dearborn and Dearborn Heights. The district's population was 77 percent white, 13 percent black and 5 percent Asian (see Race and ethnicity in the United States Census); 88 percent were high school graduates and 29 percent had received a bachelor's degree or higher. Its median income was $54,013. In the 2008 presidential election the district gave 66 percent its vote to Democratic nominee Barack Obama and 33 percent to Republican nominee John McCain.

Democrat John Dingell, who took office in 1955, was the incumbent. Dingell was re-elected in 2008 with 71 percent of the vote. In 2010 Dingell's opponent in the general election was Republican nominee Rob Steele, a cardiologist. U.S. Taxpayers Party nominee Matthew Lawrence Furman, who formerly worked in equipment repair and maintenance at the University of Michigan; Libertarian Party nominee Kerry L. Morgan, an attorney; and Green Party nominee Aimee Smith, the vice chair of the Green Party of Michigan, also ran. Dingell was unopposed in the Democratic primary. Tony Amorose, a teacher with Dearborn Public Schools; John J. "Jack" Lynch, a database systems project manager with the Eaton Corporation; and Majed A. Moughni, an attorney, also sought the Republican nomination.

Dingell raised $1,960,195 and spent $2,790,616. Steele raised $1,059,929 and spent the same amount. Amorose raised $6,475 and spent $6,370. Lynch raised $17,750 and spent $17,971.

In a poll of 400 likely voters, conducted in the week preceding September 20, 2010, by Glengariff Group Inc., 49 percent of respondents supported Dingell while 30 percent favored Steele. A poll with a sample size of 300, conducted by the Rossman Group and Team TelCom on October 4, 2010, found Steele leading with 44 percent to Dingell's 40 percent while 11 percent were undecided. In a poll of 400 likely voters, conducted by EPIC/MRA between October 16 and 19, 2010, Dingell led with 53 percent to Steele's 36 percent.

Prior to the election FiveThirtyEights forecast gave Dingell a 100 percent chance of winning and projected that he would receive 59 percent of the vote to Steele's 38 percent. On election day Dingell was re-elected with 57 percent of the vote to Steele's 40 percent. Dingell was again re-elected in 2012, and in 2014 retired rather than seeking re-election. He was succeeded by his wife Deborah Dingell.

Republican primary results

General election results

See also
 Electoral history of John Dingell

External links

See also
 List of United States representatives from Michigan
 United States congressional delegations from Michigan

References

2010 Michigan elections
2010
Michigan